Lift is an upcoming American heist action comedy-thriller film directed by F. Gary Gray and written by Dan Kunka and Jeremy Doner. The film stars Kevin Hart, Gugu Mbatha-Raw, Vincent D’Onofrio, Úrsula Corberó, Billy Magnussen, Jacob Batalon, Jean Reno, and Sam Worthington.

Lift is scheduled to be released on August 25, 2023, by Netflix.

Premise
A master thief is wooed by his ex-girlfriend and the FBI to pull off an impossible heist with his international crew on a 777 flying from London to Zurich.

Cast
 Kevin Hart
 Gugu Mbatha-Raw
 Vincent D’Onofrio
 Úrsula Corberó
 Billy Magnussen
 Jacob Batalon
 Jean Reno
 Sam Worthington
 Burn Gorman
 Yun Jee Kim
 Viveik Kalra
 Paul Anderson

Production
On March 18, 2021, Dan Kunka's spec script Lift was acquired by Netflix, with Simon Kinberg's Genre Pictures and Matt Reeves' 6th & Idaho set to produce. In September, F. Gary Gray was set to direct and Kevin Hart was attached to star and produce. On June 9, 2022, the full cast was revealed and Jeremy Doner was credited as a writer.

Release
The film is set to premiere on August 25, 2023.

References

External links
 

 

2023 action comedy films
2023 action thriller films
2020s American films
2020s comedy thriller films
2020s English-language films
2020s heist films
American action comedy films
American action thriller films
American comedy thriller films
American heist films
Films directed by F. Gary Gray
Films produced by Matt Reeves
Films produced by Simon Kinberg
Films about the Federal Bureau of Investigation
Films set in London
Films set on airplanes
Upcoming English-language films
Upcoming Netflix original films